Sunderabad railway station is a small railway station in Ratlam district, Madhya Pradesh. Its code is SNBD. It serves Sunderabad village. The station consists of two platforms, neither of which is well sheltered. It lacks many facilities including water and sanitation.

References

Railway stations in Ratlam district
Ratlam railway division